Brookula powelli is a species of sea snail, a marine gastropod mollusk unassigned in the superfamily Seguenzioidea.

Description
The maximum recorded size of the shell is 2.3 mm.

Distribution
This species occurs in the South Atlantic Ocean off Uruguay, Argentina and the South Georgia Islands, found at depths between 1000 m and 5130 m.

References

 Zelaya D.G., Absalão R.S. & Pimenta A.D. 2006. A revision of Benthobrookula Clarker, 1961 (Gastropoda, Trochoidea) in the Southwestern Atlantic Ocean. Journal of Molluscan Studies, 72(1): 77–87
 Engl W. (2012) Shells of Antarctica. Hackenheim: Conchbooks. 402 pp.

powelli
Gastropods described in 1961